Arnaud Sutchuin-Djoum (born 2 May 1989), also known as Arnaud Djoum or Arnaud Sutchuin, is a Cameroonian footballer who plays as a midfielder for Scottish Premiership club Dundee United. He has previously played for Belgian clubs Brussels and Anderlecht, in the Netherlands for Roda JC, in Turkey for Akhisar Belediyespor, in Poland with Lech Poznań, in Scotland at Heart of Midlothian, for Saudi club Al-Raed and in Cyprus for Apollon Limassol.

Career

Club
Djoum started his career at Brussels in the 2006–07 season. He played 12 matches and scored one goal for the Belgian club. He moved to Anderlecht, but failed to make a break through. In January 2009, he moved to Roda JC Kerkrade in the Netherlands appearing 119 times over a span of 5 years.

After a spell in Turkey with Akhisar Belediyespor, Djoum signed for Polish club Lech Poznań in early 2015.

Djoum then joined Heart of Midlothian in September 2015. He scored his first goal for the club in a narrow 2–1 loss to rivals Celtic in October 2015. After settling in he very quickly became a star man in Robbie Neilson's team.

He left Hearts to join Saudi club, Al-Ra'ed in July 2019, upon the expiry of his contract.

Djoum returned to Scottish football in October 2022, signing a two-year contract with Dundee United.

International
Djoum represented various Belgium youth teams, before making his senior debut for Cameroon in September 2016, in a 2–0 win over The Gambia in an Africa Cup of Nations qualifier. He played the whole 90 minutes as Cameroon defeated Egypt 2–1 on 5 February 2017, to win the 2017 Africa Cup of Nations.

Career statistics

Honours
Lech Poznań
Ekstraklasa: 2014–15

Cameroon
Africa Cup of Nations: 2017

References

External links
 
 Voetbal International profile 
 
 Profile at elfvoetbal
 

1989 births
Living people
Footballers from Yaoundé
Cameroonian footballers
Cameroon international footballers
Belgian footballers
Belgium youth international footballers
Belgian people of Cameroonian descent
R.W.D.M. Brussels F.C. players
R.S.C. Anderlecht players
Roda JC Kerkrade players
Lech Poznań players
Al-Raed FC players
Apollon Limassol FC players
Challenger Pro League players
Eredivisie players
Ekstraklasa players
Süper Lig players
Saudi Professional League players
Cypriot First Division players
Belgian expatriate footballers
Expatriate footballers in the Netherlands
Expatriate footballers in Poland
Expatriate footballers in Saudi Arabia
Expatriate footballers in Cyprus
Belgian expatriate sportspeople in the Netherlands
Belgian expatriate sportspeople in Saudi Arabia
Cameroonian expatriate sportspeople in Saudi Arabia
Cameroonian expatriate sportspeople in Cyprus
Heart of Midlothian F.C. players
Scottish Professional Football League players
Association football midfielders
2017 Africa Cup of Nations players
2017 FIFA Confederations Cup players
2019 Africa Cup of Nations players
Black Belgian sportspeople
Dundee United F.C. players